"Like I Love You" is a song by German dance band R.I.O. The song was written by Yann Peifer, Manuel Reuter, Andres Ballinas and Michael Bein. It was released in the Netherlands as a digital download on 28 January 2011. The melody is based on "Like I Love You" by The Hitmen.

Track listing
Digital download
 "Like I Love You" (Radio Edit) – 3:09
 "Like I Love You" (Video Edit) – 3:23
 "Like I Love You" (Extended Mix) – 5:44
 "Like I Love You" (Money G Remix) – 5:23
 "Like I Love You" (Black Toys Remix) – 4:52

Credits and personnel
Lead vocals – Neal Antone Dyer
Producers – Yann Peifer, Manuel Reuter
Lyrics – Yann Peifer, Manuel Reuter, Andres Ballinas, Michael Bein
Label: Spinnin Records

Charts

Release history

References

2011 singles
R.I.O. songs
2011 songs
Songs written by Yanou
Songs written by DJ Manian
Spinnin' Records singles
Songs written by Andres Ballinas